John Thomas Patterson (February 3, 1838 – March 3, 1922) served in the Union Army during the American Civil War. He received the Medal of Honor for his actions during the Second Battle of Winchester.

Early life
Patterson was born in rural Morgan County, Ohio, near McConnelsville. He married Lizzie E. Bell on January 1, 1862.

Civil War service
Patterson joined the Union Army in McConnelsville on August 22, 1862. He joined Company C of the 122nd Ohio Infantry, which mustered in on October 2, 1862. He was promoted from Musician to Principal Musician on October 8 of that year. 

On June 14, 1863, Patterson was wounded during the Second Battle of Winchester while he was rescuing a fellow soldier.  For his valor, he received the Medal of Honor.

After rescuing a fellow soldier, Patterson was taken prisoner and held for a time at Belle Isle and Libby Prison. After being released he was present at the final Battle of Appomattox Court House, along with the rest of his regiment. He was mustered out with his company on June 26, 1865.

Life after the Civil War
After the war, Patterson moved with his wife to a farm in the town of Summit, in Juneau County, Wisconsin. He served as chairman of the town board during this time.

In November 1885, he moved with his wife and children to the county seat of Mauston.  Patterson was elected and served for years as county surveyor for Juneau County, from about 1889 to 1915. Patterson also served as a member of the Juneau County board, and as an officer for Mauston.

After his wife, Lizzie, died in about 1902, Patterson married Sarah Harris in about 1906. Patterson later lived in Mauston, Wisconsin. He died in 1922.

Medal of Honor citation
His award citation reads:

With one companion, voluntarily went in front of the Union lines, under a heavy fire from the enemy, and carried back a helpless, wounded comrade, thus saving him from death or capture.

His companion, Pvt. Elbridge Robinson, also of the 122nd Ohio, also received the Medal of Honor.

See also

List of Medal of Honor recipients for the Gettysburg Campaign
List of American Civil War Medal of Honor recipients: A–F

References

External links

1838 births
1922 deaths
People from McConnelsville, Ohio
People from Juneau County, Wisconsin
People of Ohio in the American Civil War
Farmers from Wisconsin
United States Army Medal of Honor recipients
Union Army soldiers
American Civil War recipients of the Medal of Honor
County supervisors in Wisconsin
County officials in Wisconsin
Mayors of places in Wisconsin
People from Mauston, Wisconsin